Greenwood is an unincorporated community in Jefferson Township, Wells County, in the U.S. state of Indiana.

Geography

References

Unincorporated communities in Wells County, Indiana
Unincorporated communities in Indiana